Iulian Crivac (born 4 July 1976) is a retired Romanian footballer who played as a left defender, left midfielder and central defensive midfielder. After he ended his playing career, he worked as a manager.

International career
Iulian Crivac played two friendly games at the Cyprus International Football Tournament for Romania, making his debut under coach Emerich Jenei in a 2–0 victory against Latvia. His second game was a 1–1 (5–3, after penalty kicks) victory against Georgia.

Honours

Player
Argeș Pitești
Liga II: 2007–08

References

1976 births
Living people
Sportspeople from Pitești
Romanian footballers
Association football midfielders
Romania international footballers
FC Argeș Pitești players
FC Rapid București players
CS Mioveni players
Liga I players
Liga II players
Romanian football managers
FC Argeș Pitești managers